Alfred Proksch (8 March 1891 in Larischau – 3 January 1981 in Vienna) was an Austrian Nazi Party official, who briefly served as the leader of the Nazi Party in Austria.

Life
Proksch enrolled in the Kaiser Infantry Regiment No. 1 of the Austro-Hungarian Army in 1910 and then the Railway Academy in Linz in 1912 before taking a job with the government railways. He returned to the army in 1914 with the Infantry Regiment No. 91 and saw action during the World War I in Poland and Russia. He first became involved in politics in 1912 when he joined the German Workers' Party and worked on behalf of the party in Silesia and Moravia.

After his war service Proksch settled in the now much smaller Austria and returned to politics by rejoining the renamed Deutsche Nationalsozialistische Arbeiterpartei. Proksch met Adolf Hitler as early as 1919 and became a loyal follower of the German from then on. Proksch launched the Nazis in Linz in Upper Austria the same year. He also founded both the party newspaper Linzer Volksstimme (1923) and the NSP-Verlag publishing house (1926). In 1922, Proksch began to team up with the Passau National Socialists to fight against leftists in Linz. Later, he was a featured speaker in Passau and other towns in Lower Bavaria. He also served on the Linz City Council as the chairman of the Nazi faction from July 1923 to January 1932.

On 29 August 1926 Hitler appointed Proksch Gauleiter for Upper Austria, and he served in this post until June 1927. In 1928 he was made Deputy Landesleiter (State Leader) for all of Austria. Then on 6 June 1931 he was promoted to Landesleiter and held the post until 23 June 1933, although most power rested with Hitler's personal representative, the German Theodor Habicht. However, Proksch did have strong influence over finances and he was credited with eliminating the 30,000 schillings of debt that the party found itself in. He fled to Germany on 24 June 1933 following the banning of the Nazi Party in Austria. He settled in Munich where he was made Deputy to Habicht who continued to be responsible for Austrian policy. Proksch returned to Austria in time to take part in the coup attempt that resulted in the killing of Engelbert Dollfuss in 1934. In July 1934 he was granted the title of Honorary Gauleiter.  Returning to Germany, he acquired German citizenship in 1935. In March 1936, he was elected to the Reichstag for electoral constituency 34, Hamburg, and in April 1938 he switched to representing district 8, Liegnitz.

Given Proksch's position as a Hitler loyalist, his profile was raised following the Anschluss. Joining the Sturmabteilung (SA) as an SA-Gruppenführer in June 1938, he was promoted to SA-Obergruppenführer on 20 April 1943. In 1940 he was made the Reich Trustee of Labor for Vienna and Lower Austria.  He then served as President of the Labor Office in Vienna from 1943 to 1945. Arrested in May 1945, he was interned, tried by the People's Court in Vienna and sentenced to 4 years hard labor. After his release, he worked as a laborer until 1956.

References

1891 births
1981 deaths
People from Bruntál District
People from Austrian Silesia
Austrian Nazis
Members of the Reichstag of Nazi Germany
Austro-Hungarian military personnel of World War I
Sturmabteilung officers